Vladimir Veselinov (Serbian Cyrillic: Владимир Веселинов; born 25 May 1984) is a Serbian former professional footballer who played as a midfielder.

External links
 HLSZ profile
 
 

1984 births
Living people
Sportspeople from Subotica
Serbia and Montenegro footballers
Serbian footballers
Association football midfielders
Serbian expatriate footballers
Serbian expatriate sportspeople in Belarus
Serbian expatriate sportspeople in Hungary
Expatriate footballers in Belarus
Expatriate footballers in Hungary
Belarusian Premier League players
Serbian First League players
Serbian SuperLiga players
FK Spartak Subotica players
FK Banat Zrenjanin players
FC Neman Grodno players
Szeged-Csanád Grosics Akadémia footballers
Budafoki LC footballers
Nemzeti Bajnokság II players